Nikki is the second studio album by the Canadian singer Nikki Yanofsky, released on May 4, 2010. Four singles were released from the record.

Track listing

Chart performance

Album

Singles

References 

2010 albums
Nikki Yanofsky albums
Decca Records albums